The Gänseschnabel is a natural monument north of Ilfeld in Thuringia, Germany. It is a striking, free-standing rock pillar made of porphyry, which resembles the beak of a goose (or duck) and from which there is a comprehensive view of the Behre valley looking towards Netzkater.

There is a legend connected with the Gänseschnabel about a spellbound goose girl who had fallen in love with a monk from the monastery at Ilfeld. A witch went to transform the monk in a rock when he waved to her from the other side of the valley. As the goose girl burst into tears, the witch turned her to stone as well.

References

Sources 
 

Rock formations of Thuringia
Natural monuments in Thuringia
Rock formations of the Harz
Nordhausen (district)